U.S. Highway 8 (US 8) is a United States Numbered Highway that runs primarily east–west for , mostly within the state of Wisconsin. It connects Interstate 35 (I-35) in Forest Lake, Minnesota, to US 2 at Norway in the Upper Peninsula of Michigan near the border with Wisconsin. Except for the short freeway segment near Forest Lake, and sections near the St. Croix River bridge and Rhinelander, Wisconsin, it is mostly an undivided surface road. As a state highway in the three states, US 8 is maintained by the Minnesota, Wisconsin and Michigan departments of transportation (MnDOT, WisDOT, and MDOT, respectively).

The highway was originally commissioned on November 11, 1926, with the rest of the original U.S. Highway System. At the time, it ran between Forest Lake, Minnesota, and Pembine, Wisconsin, with a planned continuation to Powers, Michigan. Several changes have been made to the routing of the highway since then. The western end was extended south to Minneapolis before it was truncated back to Forest Lake. Other changes on the east end have moved that terminus from the originally planned end location at Powers to the current location in Norway. Internal WisDOT and MDOT map files at various times have shown plans to reroute the highway to connect to the original planned 1926 terminus. US 8's course through the three states has also been shifted to follow different alignments over the years.

WisDOT built a bypass around the city of Rhinelander in the 1990s and created a business loop along the old highway through the town. This loop was a locally maintained route through the central business district in Rhinelander. The signage for the loop was removed in 2005.

Route description

Forest Lake to St. Croix Falls 
US 8 begins at an interchange with I-35 in Forest Lake. This interchange is incomplete: traffic can only access US 8 directly from northbound I-35, and westbound traffic on US 8 merges onto southbound I-35. The first  segment of roadway to Forest Lake is a freeway, with an interchange at US 61. East of this junction, the highway follows Lake Boulevard North around Forest Lake and continues northeasterly through the community to cross the Washington–Chisago county line. The highway continues to the northeast along farmland and the shore of Green Lake to Chisago City, where it meets up with County State-Aid Highway 22 (CSAH 22). US 8 follows Lake Boulevard through Chisago City along the isthmus between the larger Chisago Lake and the smaller Wallmark Lake on the eastern side of town. The highway turns along a more easterly path in Lindström between North and South Lindström lakes. East of those lakes, US 8 crosses into the town of Center City.

In Center City, US 8 runs between North and South Center lakes, curving around the north shore of South Center Lake. On the eastern edge of town, it turns due east for several miles and runs through Shafer. The two highways concurrently turn northeast along the St. Croix River, entering town. At this point, MN 95 continues north along the river while US 8 turns east to cross the St. Croix River, exiting the state of Minnesota into Wisconsin.

Legally, the Minnesota section of US 8 is defined as Constitutional Route 46 and Legislative Route 98 in the Minnesota Statutes §§161.114(2) and 161.115(29); the roadway is not marked with those numbers. The section of US 8 in Chisago County is officially designated the Moberg Trail.

St. Croix Falls to Rhinelander 
US 8 enters Polk County at St. Croix Falls as a multilane roadway. The two highways run concurrently for  before WIS 35 turns off to the north at a location in the Town of St. Croix Falls west of Deer Lake. US 8 continues eastward through forest lands, and WIS 46 joins from the north for a  concurrency before splitting off to the south. Continuing eastward, US 8 passes through Range and crosses into Barron County at Turtle Lake. US 63 merges from the south near Turtle Lake and departs to the north in the downtown area. The roadway passes through Poskin and intersects WIS 25 in Barron. East of Barron, US 8 meets US 53 at a mixed diamond/cloverleaf interchange and turns north into Cameron, then turns east in downtown to leave the latter community. After a  straightaway, the highway crosses into Rusk County, and then it continues due east for an additional  before turning northeast and passing through Weyerhaeuser. Continuing northeasterly, the roadway crosses WIS 40 in Bruce. East of town, the highway continues through rural Rusk County, and US 8 meets WIS 27 in downtown Ladysmith.

Upon leaving Ladysmith, US 8 passes through the communities of Tony, Glen Flora, Ingram (where it meets the northern terminus of WIS 73) and Hawkins on its way out of Rusk County. In Price County, US 8 passes through Kennan and Catawba. WIS 111 terminates at its south end on US 8 just east of Catawba. US 8 meets WIS 13 at a diamond interchange northwest of Prentice and passes north of the city. The highway passes through Brantwood and enters Lincoln County at Clifford. Further east,  US 8 crosses Tripoli and McCord and runs north of Tomahawk as it passes through the Lake Nokomis area. US 51 crosses US 8 northeast of Tomahawk. US 8 turns northeast into Oneida County and onto a twisting northeasterly alignment. The highway passes through Woodboro and expands to a divided highway into Rhinelander. It merges with WIS 47 on the southwest side of Rhinelander. WIS 17 north joins the highways  to the southeast, creating a wrong-way concurrency with WIS 47; along this section of highway, eastbound US 8 is also southbound WIS 47 and northbound WIS 17 and vice versa.

Rhinelander to Norway 
US 8 intersects US 45 south in Monico, and WIS 47 splits from US 8 to follow US 45 south. Immediately east of the same intersection, US 45 north follows US 8 for  before splitting to the north. US 8 turns east again at Cavour and passes through the community of Armstrong Creek  from the Marinette County line. The highway passes through Goodman and Dunbar as it meanders through the county and joins US 141 at Pembine. The two routes split  further north near Niagara; after the split, US 8 heads east. The highway takes a northward turn and heads across the Menominee River into Michigan near Pier's Gorge Park.

Entering Michigan south of Norway at the Menominee River crossing in Norway Township, US 8 proceeds north into the city where it ends at US 2.

History

20th century 
Starting in 1918, the Wisconsin Highway Commission erected highway numbers along state-maintained roadways. The highway across the state from St. Croix Falls to Armstrong Creek was numbered WIS 14 at that time. The remainder of what is now US 8 was unnumbered secondary highways, and WIS 14 continued north of Armstrong Creek to Florence. When Michigan numbered its highway system the following year, the future US 8 was not included in the system. In Minnesota, US 8 would follow what was Constitutional Route 46, which was designated in a state constitutional amendment adopted on November 2, 1920; that roadway originally ran between Forest Lake and Chisago City through Wyoming.

The first changes to the routings of the predecessor highways were made by Wisconsin by 1920. A series of curves were added between Turtle Lake and Barron adding "stair steps" to the routing while similar jogs were removed near Cameron, Weyerhauser, Hawkins and Prentice. WIS 14 was rerouted between Rhinelander and Pelican Lake to run via Monico, and WIS 38 (the future US 141) was extended northward from Wausaukee to terminate at the state line near Niagara. The realignment between Rhinelander and Pelican Lake was shown as reversed by 1922. By 1925, the highway in that area was again rerouted to run directly from Rhinelander to Monico, but instead of turning south to Pelican Lake, it was run directly to Crandon. That same year, WIS 14 was extended eastward from Armstrong Creek to Pembine and northward to Niagara. The north–south section, previously numbered WIS 38, was also redesignated as part of WIS 57.

US 8 was created with the beginnings of the United States Numbered Highway System on November 26, 1926. The highway was originally shown on maps running between Forest Lake, Minnesota and Powers, Michigan. At the time, its planned routing was not previously designated as part of the State Trunkline Highway System in Michigan. The trunkline connection from Quinnesec south into Wisconsin was part of M-57, which met WIS 57 at the state line. US 8 ended at WIS 57 in Pembine at the time, with no connection into Michigan shown on official maps. A map by the American Automobile Association does show the highway continuing east through Faithorn and Hermansville in Michigan to end at US 2. The Wisconsin Highway Commission previously indicated an unnumbered state highway on their 1925 state map that connected Pembine with the Menominee River near Hermansville. A later extension in 1927 moved US 8 to run along US 141, which had replaced WIS 57 and M-57, ending in Quinnesec at US 2. By the next year, the highway was shifted to end in Norway, utilizing a separate crossing of the Menominee River to enter Michigan.

In 1931, US 8 was extended south from Forest Lake into downtown Minneapolis. This concurrency was altered in 1934, and two years later the short east–west section of US 8/US 51 was removed when changes to US 51's routing were finished in the area. A jog in the routing near Almena was removed in 1937 when Wisconsin rerouted the highway to a more direct alignment in the area.

The last segment of US 8 in Wisconsin was paved in 1937 between Cavour and Armstrong Creek; the highway in Minnesota was paved in its entirety by 1940. Near Hawkins, a pair of sharp curves near the Rusk–Price county line were removed as the State Highway Commission realigned the highway to follow a straighter course. The US 8/US 51 concurrency was altered the next year to a shorter overlap running southward near Heafford Junction. The former routing of US 8 was redesignated County Trunk Highway K (CTH-K) after it was transferred back to county control.

Starting around the year 1955, US 8 was moved to a more direct routing between Forest Lake and Chisago City; US 8 replaced MN 98 along Legislative Route 98. The former routing between Wyoming and Chisago City along Constitutional Route 46 was then redesignated MN 98 until it was decommissioned in the late 1990s.

As late as 1959, the Michigan State Highway Department still had plans to build the section of US 8 west of Hermansville to the Menominee River. The control section atlas published on January 1, 1959, showed this segment of highway on the Menominee County map, complete with a control section number. The section of highway is shown as "proposed" or "under construction". However, a new bridge was built over the Menominee River to carry the highway across the Michigan–Wisconsin state line near Norway in 1966. WisDOT still shows the section of highway needed in their state to extend US 8 to the original eastern terminus in Michigan on internal maps. The December 31, 2004, edition of their Official State Trunk Highway System Maps shows this section as a "mapped corridor".

In the late 1970s, with ongoing construction and completion of the I-35W freeway in Minnesota, US 8 was routed along I-35W; US 8 was truncated again by 1981 to its current terminus in Forest Lake. The section in New Brighton is currently known as Old Highway 8.

WisDOT built a bypass of the city of Rhinelander during the early 1990s; the new highway was constructed south of town as a new two-lane highway that opened to traffic by 1993. The former route through downtown Rhinelander and near Clear and George lakes was redesignated as Business US 8 (Bus. US 8).

21st century 

In 2002, US 8 was widened from two lanes to four lanes with a grass median between North Rifle Road and WIS 47 near Rhinelander, Wisconsin. At the time, officials with WisDOT had plans to extend the four-lane divided highway as far west as US 51 near Tomahawk. Problems related to wetlands in the construction area and bad weather pushed completion of the project back almost a year. Contractors had to install metal sheeting to stabilize the marshy ground. Originally scheduled to end in late 2002, the project did not finish until August 2003. The delays and additional work increased the price tag of the project from the original $4.5 million (equivalent to $ in ) to $6.0 million (equivalent to $ in ). A section of the project was only designed for  speeds for safety reasons. The design also allowed planners to limit the amount of land needed for the expansion.

Bill and Jerri Osberg sued the state and seven other parties in April 2003 over runoff from the construction, claiming that it killed hundreds of trees and polluted ponds on their property. Later investigation uncovered damage to wildlife habitat in the Wisconsin River. Included in the original lawsuit were six individual WisDOT employees, the primary contractor and a local pet supply company. The court of appeals partially upheld a ruling by the district court dismissing the employees and the contractor from the lawsuit in March 2006. The pet supply company was reinstated in the case by the appeals court. The couple settled their claims, and the state pursued the matter against Pagel Construction in a related lawsuit. WisDOT alleged that the contractor did not follow proper erosion controls and failed to remediate the erosion damage to the Osbergs' property. The state wanted the construction company to forfeit their $70,000 retainer (equivalent to $ in ) and pay damages of $150,000 (equivalent to $ in ). Pagel Construction faulted WisDOT's erosion control plan and said that the state's engineers controlled the project and was seeking the return of its retainer. In September 2007, a jury ruled in favor of Pagel Construction and awarded them $70,898.13 in damages (equivalent to $ in ).

Future 
WisDOT has completed the environmental studies of bypasses of Barron and Cameron in Barron County. These bypasses would form a continuous expressway through the area. No funding has been identified to complete the projects. The entire length of US 8 in the state has been classified as a North Country Corridor in the Connections 2030 Plan by the department. This designation marks the highway as a priority in "continued safety, enhanced mobility and efficiency" as well as "modernization to correct outdated infrastructure design".

Major intersections

Business route 

Business U.S. Highway 8 (Bus. US 8) in Rhinelander, Wisconsin, was a locally maintained business loop highway routing through the central business district of the city. The route was designated when US 8 was shifted to a bypass of downtown in 1992. The former routing of US 8 through the area was designated as a business loop, and it was turned over to the city and county for maintenance. The local authorities erected signs along this route to designate it as a business loop of the main highway south of town. The signs along the road were scheduled to be removed on July 1, 2005, when the business loop was to be redesignated CTH-P.

Before the signage was removed, Bus. US 8 started at the western junction of US 8 and WIS 47. The business loop ran east from this intersection along Kemp Street, crossing the Wisconsin River north of the convergence with the Pelican River. The loop jogged north along Oneida Street for three blocks and turned east again on Lincoln Street. East of town, Bus. US 8 intersected WIS 17 and turned to the southeast. Outside of town, the business loop ran through wooded terrain and turned south near Clear Lake. Near the larger George Lake, the roadway curved back east along the lake's southern shore, running parallel to the main highway before turning south to connect to the main highway.

See also 

 U.S. Highway 208

Notes

References

External links 

 
 US 8 at The Unofficial Minnesota Highways Page
 US 8 at Historic Minnesota Highways
 US 8 at Wisconsin Highways
 US 8 at Michigan Highways
 US 8 at US Ends
 US 8 at Minnesota State Highway Endings
 Bus. US 8 on the Master List at Wisconsin Highways

08
08
08
08
Transportation in Washington County, Minnesota
Transportation in Chisago County, Minnesota
Transportation in Polk County, Wisconsin
Transportation in Barron County, Wisconsin
Transportation in Rusk County, Wisconsin
Transportation in Price County, Wisconsin
Transportation in Lincoln County, Wisconsin
Transportation in Oneida County, Wisconsin
Transportation in Forest County, Wisconsin
Transportation in Marinette County, Wisconsin
Transportation in Dickinson County, Michigan